The Central Tamil dialect is a dialect of Tamil spoken in the districts of Thanjavur, Tiruvarur, Nagapattinam, Karur and Tiruchirapalli in central Tamil Nadu, India and to some extent, in the neighbouring Cuddalore and Pudukkottai districts. Along with Madurai Tamil, the Central Tamil dialect is considered to be one of the purest forms of spoken Tamil in Tamil Nadu and is considered to be the basis of standard spoken Tamil in the state. Of the different Tamil dialects, the Central Tamil dialect bears the closest affinity to Brahmin Tamil.

References 

Tamil dialects
Culture of Tiruchirappalli